Several Reliquaries of Saint Thomas Becket were produced by the Limoges enamellists in the 1200s to house relics of Thomas Becket.

Reliquaries in public collections

France
 Musée d'art Roger-Quilliot in Clermont-Ferrand;
 Musée de la Sénatorerie in Guéret;
 Musée de l'Évêché in Limoges;
 Musée des Beaux-Arts in Lyon;
 Musée du Louvre in Paris (2 reliquaries - Murder and Burial of Saint Thomas Becket and Martyrdom and Glorification of Saint Thomas Becket;
 Musée national du Moyen Âge in Paris (2 reliquaries);
 Sens Cathedral;
 Église Saint-Laurent in Le Vigean;

Germany
 Schnütgen Museum in Cologne;
 Museum für Kunst und Gewerbe in Hamburg;

Italy
 Anagni Cathedral;
 Museum of Lucca Cathedral;

Sweden
 Church in Trönö, Hälsingland

United Kingdom
 Ashmolean Museum in Oxford;
 Hereford Cathedral;
 British Museum in London;
 Victoria and Albert Museum in London;
 Burrell Collection in Glasgow;

USA
 Glencairn Museum in Bryn Athyn (Pennsylvania);
 Cleveland Museum of Art in Cleveland (plaque);
 Allen Memorial Art Museum in Oberlin
 California Palace of the Legion of Honor in San Francisco;
 Toledo Art Museum in Toledo;

References

Sources
http://www.paradoxplace.com/Photo%20Pages/UK/British%20History/Saint_Thomas/Beckets_Bits.htm
http://www.metmuseum.org/toah/works-of-art/17.190.520

Objets d'art of the Louvre
Collections of the Victoria and Albert Museum
Medieval European objects in the British Museum
Thomas Becket
Limoges enamel